Soli or Só was a zemlja of the medieval Bosnian state, located in today's northern Bosnia and Herzegovina, centered around the town of Tuzla. Initially, a Slavic župa, the County of Soli became an integral part of Kulin's Bosnia and later both of Banate of Bosnia and of the Kingdom of Bosnia. The meaning of the name is "salts". With the arrival of the Ottoman Empire around 1512, the names of the villages "Gornje Soli" and "Donje Soli" were translated to "Memlehai-bala" and "Memlehai-zir", literally meaning Upper and Lower Saltworks, resp.

See also
 Usora (zemlja)

References

Literature

 
 
 
 
 

Historical counties of Bosnia and Herzegovina
Zemljas of the medieval Bosnian state